Round Church may refer to:
 Round Church, Orphir, Orkney, United Kingdom
 Round Church, Preslav, a 10th-century church in Preslav, Bulgaria
 Round Church, Cambridge or Holy Sepulchre, a 12th-century church in Cambridge, England, UK
 Round Church (Richmond, Vermont), a 19th-century meeting house in Richmond, Vermont, U.S.
 Round church, a special type of church construction, having a completely circular plan